Forman Arthur Williams (born January 12, 1934) is an American academic in the field of combustion and aerospace engineering who is Emeritus Professor of Mechanical and Aerospace Engineering at the University of California San Diego.

Education
Williams received his bachelor's degree from Princeton University in 1955 and on Martin Summerfield's advice, he moved to California Institute of Technology to pursue his PhD, graduating it in 1958 under the supervision of Sol Penner, with Richard Feynman on the thesis committee. He presented his PhD thesis to von Kármán at his home, who had influenced Williams greatly.

Career
After finishing his PhD, Williams worked in the Division of Engineering and Applied Physics at Harvard University until 1964, after which he joined the faculty at UCSD. He was the fourth faculty member to be appointed, when Sol Penner founded the Engineering department in University of California, San Diego. In January 1981, he accepted the Robert H. Goddard chair at Princeton, eventually returning to UCSD in 1988. Williams also served as an adjunct Professor at Yale University for one month of each year starting in 1997 and culminating after ten years. He was also the director of Center for Energy Research from 1990 to 2006 at UCSD. He served as a department chair at UCSD for four years.

Research
Williams' research interests includes combustion, propulsion applications, micro-gravity flames etc. He made seminal contributions to the combustion field for the past six decades and considered as one of the prominent scientist in combustion. He wrote the Williams spray equation in 1958 when he was still a PhD student, as a statistical model for spray combustion analogous to Boltzmann equation. Though Activation Energy Asymptotics were known to Russian scientists forty years ago, it was Williams' call in 1971 in Annual Review of Fluid Mechanics which made the western scientific community to start using the analysis. He wrote down the G equation in 1985, a model for premixed turbulent flame as a wrinkled flame. The classification of Combustion instabilities was first introduced by Williams and Barrère in 1969.

He worked on number of projects with NASA, Air force and other organizations. He is the principal investigator of the following International Space Station experiments,
MDCA (Multi-user Droplet Combustion Apparatus), FSDC (Fiber Supported Droplet Combustion), FSDC-2 (Fiber Supported Droplet Combustion - 2), DCE (Droplet Combustion Experiment), FLEX (Flame Extinguishment Experiment), FLEX-2 (Flame Extinguishment Experiment - 2), Cool Flames Investigation. He conducted lot of experiments, some of his recent experiments include spiral flames in von Kármán swirling flow, ethanol flames, fire spread etc.

Publications

Williams Combustion Theory, second edition published in 1985, is still an authoritative book in the combustion field.

Books

Lecture Notes

Honors

Williams is an elected member of National Academy of Engineering (1988) and also in American Academy of Arts and Sciences (2010). He is a fellow of The Combustion Institute. He is elected as a fellow of APS in 2002. He is also a member of AIAA, SIAM etc. He holds an honorary doctorate degree from Technical University of Madrid. He has been in the editorial board of various journals, currently he is in the editorial board of Progress in Energy and Combustion Science, Combustion Science and Technology. He was a member of the National Construction Safety Team Advisory Committee in reporting the Collapse of the World Trade Center. Some of his awards include:

 Silver Combustion Medal (1978) from The Combustion Institute
 Alexander von Humboldt U.S. Senior Scientist Award (1982)
 Bernard Lewis Gold Medal (1990) from The Combustion Institute
 Pendray Aerospace Literature Award (1993) from AIAA
 Numa Munson Medal (1995) from ICDERS
 Thermal Engineering Award for International Activity (1999) from JSME
Propellants & Combustion Award (2004) from AIAA 
 Distinguished Public Service Medal (2017) from NASA

A conference titled Symposium on Advancements in Combustion Theory was conducted at UCSD in 2004 in honor of Williams 70th birthday. Combustion Science and Technology released a special issue in honor of Williams 80th birthday.

References

External links
 

1934 births
Living people
Engineers from California
People from New Brunswick, New Jersey
Princeton University School of Engineering and Applied Science alumni
Fluid dynamicists
California Institute of Technology alumni
University of California, San Diego faculty
Members of the United States National Academy of Engineering
Engineers from New Jersey
Fellows of The Combustion Institute
Fellows of the American Physical Society
Fellows of the American Institute of Aeronautics and Astronautics
Fellows of the American Academy of Arts and Sciences
Fellows of the Society for Industrial and Applied Mathematics